Mburuvicha is a monotypic genus of Argentinian jumping spiders containing the single species, Mburuvicha galianoae. It was first described by C. L. Scioscia in 1993, and is only found in Argentina. The name is derived from the Guaraní word Mburuvicha, meaning "chief". The species name honors arachnologist María Elena Galiano.

References

Endemic fauna of Argentina
Monotypic Salticidae genera
Salticidae
Spiders of Argentina